Bence Tóth (born 25 May 1998) is a Hungarian professional footballer who plays for Szeged-Csanád.

Career

Early years
He made his professional debut in the 2016–17 campaign, with the Puskás Akadémia in the second division against Sopron on 19 August 2016.

Club career
On 31 January 2019, MOL Vidi FC announced that they had loaned out Tóth to Vasas SC for the rest of the season.

On 16 June 2022, Tóth signed with Szeged-Csanád.

International career
He received his first call up to the senior Hungary squad for the friendly match against Russia and 2018 FIFA World Cup qualification against Andorra in June 2017 and he played his first match in the national team on 9 June against Andorra.

Club statistics

Updated to games played as of 16 December 2018.

References

External links
HLSZ 
profile at magyarfutball.hu 
at club home page 

1998 births
People from Tapolca
Sportspeople from Veszprém County
Living people
Hungarian footballers
Hungary youth international footballers
Hungary under-21 international footballers
Hungary international footballers
Association football defenders
Puskás Akadémia FC players
Fehérvár FC players
Vasas SC players
Szolnoki MÁV FC footballers
Szeged-Csanád Grosics Akadémia footballers
Nemzeti Bajnokság I players
Nemzeti Bajnokság II players